Mard ō mard (Middle Persian; literally "man to man") was an ancient Iranian tradition of single combat, the Sasanian Empire being most known for using it. During a battle, the Sasanian troops would use taunts and war cries to provoke the enemy into a single duel with a Sasanian champion. The tradition meant much to the Sasanians—in 421, during Bahram V's war against the Romans in 421–422, Ardazanes, a member of the "Immortals", was in a single duel killed by the Roman comes Areobindus, which contributed to Bahram V's acceptance of the defeat in the war and making peace with the Romans.

In Sasanian art several mard o mard depictions are preserved in rock-reliefs in Naqsh-e Rostam and in a cameo of Shapur I and Valerian.

Single combats have been narrated in Shahnameh ("The Book of Kings") of Ferdowsi, a notable example being those of the story of Davazdah Rokh ("Twelve Combats").

In the Second Perso-Turkic War, the Sasanian commander Smbat IV Bagratuni possibly killed the Hephthalite leader in single combat.

References

Sources 

 

Warfare by type
Dueling
Military history of the Sasanian Empire